FC Ursidos Chişinău is a defunct Moldovan football club from Chişinău, Moldova. They were founded in 2010 and played for a season in the 2010–11 Moldovan "A" Division, the second division in Moldovan football.

History
The aim for their first season was promotion to the Moldovan National Division, but they finished in second place in the 2010–11 Moldovan "A" Division, with champions being Locomotiv Bălţi, who did not apply for a National Division license. Despite this, second-placed Ursidos were not allowed to play in the first division, after they could not meet requirements for the National Division license, due to not having their own stadium. In the 2011–12 season, they merged with FC Milsami Orhei and formed FC Milsami-Ursidos Orhei.

League results

See also
FC Milsami Orhei

References

Ursidos, FC
Ursidos, FC
Ursidos, FC
2010 establishments in Moldova
2011 disestablishments in Moldova
Football clubs in Chișinău